A tanbou is the national musical instrument and type of barrel drum from Haiti. The drum is used in many music genres of Haiti and has been influential in the rest of the Caribbean and Latin American world.

Etymology
Tanbou is derived from the French word tambour, which means drum.

Origins
The lineage of this Haitian drum is complex, originating in West African Vodun systems. A tanbou needs to be crafted properly in order to get the best sound. The drum is no longer used in Nigeria, but the banda rhythm that has been kept alive by Haitian drummers, such as "Bonga" (Gaston Jean-Baptiste).

Sound
A tanbou produces an organic, versatile sound that can be used for dance, professional recording, and supposedly healing and merry making. The drum has survived centuries and some of the oldest are from old temples in Haiti. The older the drum, the better the sound according to the drummers.

Construction
The tambou is made with a stick like a vessel; a hardwood – tronpèt, bwachen, gomye – and covered with a piece of animal skin or a material capable of awe as the skins in a corner are made goat or cow. These drums can be used like regular congas. It is very difficult to get drums from Haiti into the United States because crafting them is equally challenging due to the finding the right wood and particularly the skins which must be procured under the exact conditions.

References

External links
Website of Gaston "Bonga" Jean-Baptiste

Haitian musical instruments
Hand drums
Percussion instruments used as both pitched and unpitched
Central American and Caribbean percussion instruments